Kim Meen-whee (born 22 February 1992), also known as Whee Kim,  is a South Korean professional golfer.

Amateur career
As an amateur, Kim won the gold medal at the 2010 Asian Games, both individual and team. He turned professional shortly afterwards. As a gold medalist in the Asian Games, Kim is exempt from military service.

Professional career
After turning professional Kim played on the Korean Tour and the OneAsia Tour. He finished eighth on the OneAsia Tour's Order of Merit in 2011. He won the 2012 Shinhan Donghae Open on the Korean Tour.

Kim led the second and third rounds of the 2012 PGA Tour Qualifying Tournament, but finished outside the top 25 with a 43rd-place finish, giving him Web.com Tour status. Kim played on the Web.com Tour in 2013 and 2014. His best finish was a tie for second place in the 2013 Mexico Championship.

Kim has played mostly on the PGA Tour since 2015. He was twice a runner-up in 2017, in the FedEx St. Jude Classic and then losing in a playoff in the Shriners Hospitals for Children Open, an early season event on the 2018 PGA Tour. He was also runner-up in the 2015 Korea Open and in 2018 he had his second Korean Tour win in the Descente Korea Munsingwear Matchplay.

Amateur wins
2010 Asian Games - Gold Medal

Professional wins (3)

Korean Tour wins (2)

Other wins (1)

Playoff record
PGA Tour playoff record (0–1)

Results in major championships

CUT = missed the half-way cut
"T" = tied

Team appearances
Amateur
Eisenhower Trophy (representing South Korea): 2010

See also
2014 Web.com Tour Finals graduates
2016 Web.com Tour Finals graduates

References

External links

South Korean male golfers
PGA Tour golfers
Asian Games medalists in golf
Asian Games gold medalists for South Korea
Golfers at the 2010 Asian Games
Medalists at the 2010 Asian Games
Korn Ferry Tour graduates
1992 births
Living people